Momonipta albiplaga is a moth of the family Notodontidae. It is found along the western slope of the Colombian Andes.

References

Moths described in 1897
Notodontidae of South America